Molonglo Parish, New South Wales is a civil parish of Murray County.

It includes Hoskinstown and Forbes Creek.

References

Parishes of Murray County
Queanbeyan–Palerang Regional Council